Marvin Lee Williams (born October 11, 1963) is a former American football tight end in the National Football League for the Washington Redskins.  He played college football at California State University, Fullerton.

In 2022, Williams joined the XFL as the offensive quality control coach for the Houston Roughnecks.

1963 births
Living people
Sportspeople from Santa Rosa, California
American football tight ends
Cal State Fullerton Titans football players
Houston Roughnecks coaches
Washington Redskins players